The Red Youth (Marxist-Leninist) was a revolutionary youth organization in the Netherlands. 

Red Youth (ml) originated from the Red Youth organization. The Red Youth had been divided into two camps, the 'terrorists', who were inspired by the Rote Armee Fraktion and who saw the strategy of urban guerrilla warfare as a path to follow, and the 'economists', who wanted to focus on socioeconomic struggles. After the Red Youth congress in July 1971 the 'economists', based in the Red Youth branches in Amsterdam and Kampen, broke away and formed Red Youth (ml).

In 1972 Red Youth (ml) merged into the League of Dutch Marxist-Leninists (BNML).

Communism in the Netherlands
Youth organisations based in the Netherlands
Youth organizations established in 1971
1971 establishments in the Netherlands
Organizations disestablished in 1972
1972 disestablishments in the Netherlands